Grace Addo (born 24 December 1960) is a Ghanaian politician. She was a member of the Sixth Parliament of the Fourth Republic of Ghana. She represented the Manso-Nkwanta constituency and is a member of the New Patriotic Party.

Early years and education 
Addo was born on 24 December 1960 at Asarekrom in the Ashanti Region. She holds a bachelor's degree in mathematics from the University of Education, Winneba.

Career 
Prior to becoming a member of the Parliament of Ghana in 2012. She worked as a tutor at Ejuraman Anglican School.

Politics 
Addo was the former New Patriotic Party member of parliament representative for Manso-Nkwanta constituency. In 2012, she contested in the General Elections and won. She garnered 29, 500 votes which represents 77.03% of the total votes cast and hence defeated the other contestants including Alex Kwame Bonsu, Seth Amakye and Rita Fosuah. In 2016, she lost in the New Patriotic Party parliamentary elections and hence did not get the chance to represent the party in the 2016 Ghanaian General Elections. In 2020, she again lost in the New Patriotic Party parliamentary elections.

Personal life 
Addo is a Christian. She is married with three children.

References

Living people
1960 births
Ghanaian Roman Catholics
University of Education, Winneba alumni
Women members of the Parliament of Ghana
New Patriotic Party politicians
Ghanaian MPs 2013–2017
21st-century Ghanaian women politicians